The road signs used in Mexico are regulated by Secretaría de Comunicaciones y Transportess Directorate-General for Roads (Dirección General de Carreteras), and uniformized under a NOM standard and the Manual de Dispositivos para el Control del Tránsito en Calles y Carreteras, which serves as a similar role to the MUTCD developed by the Federal Highway Administration. The signs share many similarities with those used in the United States and Canada. Like Canada but unlike the United States, Mexico had a heavier reliance on symbols than text legends.

Regulatory signs

Warning signs

Tourism and services

Guide signs

Other

References

External links 
 

Mexico
Road transportation in Mexico